

Baloch nationalism (Balochi: راج دۏستی بلۏچی) asserts that the Baloch people, an ethnic group native to Pakistan, Iran and Afghanistan are a distinct nation, and that their ethnicity overrides religious loyalty. The origins of modern Baloch nationalism coupled with the insurgency in Balochistan lie in the uncertainty regarding the signing of the Instrument of Accession (Kalat) around the time of the partition of India.

The News International reported in 2012 that a local survey organization "Gallup" conducted a survey that revealed that the majority of Baloch do not support independence from Pakistan. About 37 percent of Baloch were in favour of independence. Amongst Balochistan's Pashtun population support for independence was even lower at 12 percent. However, a majority (67 percent) of Balochistan's population did favour greater provincial autonomy. A survey in 2009 by the Pew Research Center found that 58% of respondents in Balochistan chose ″Pakistani″ as their primary mode of identification, 32% chose their ethnicity and 10% chose both equally.

Baloch ethnicity and nationalism
Baloch nationalism is mostly popular in southern and eastern parts of Balochistan.

The Baloch nationalist movement's demands have ranged from greater cultural, economic and political rights, to political autonomy, to outright secession and the creation of an independent state of Balochistan. The movement is secular and heavily influenced by leftist Marxist ideology, like its other counterparts in other parts of Pakistan.

The movement claims to receive considerable support from the Baloch diaspora in Oman, the UAE, Sweden, Norway, and other countries. Pakistan has repeatedly made claims that the Baloch nationalists have received funding from India, although these have been denied by India. Similarly, Afghanistan has acknowledged providing covert support to the Baloch nationalist militants. In the 1960s and 1970s, the Republic of Afghanistan provided sanctuary to Baloch militants. The Republic of Afghanistan had established training camps in Kandahar to train Baloch militants and also to provide arms and ammunition.

Modern Baloch nationalism
Baloch nationalism in its modern form began in the form of the Anjuman-e-Ittehad-e-Balochan (Organisation for Unity of the Baloch) based in Mastung in 1929, led by Yousaf Aziz Magsi, Abdul Aziz Kurd and others. In November 1929, Yousaf Aziz Magsi published an article stating the aims of the group, namely:
Unification and independence of Balochistan; 
A democratic, socialist system guided by Islamic universalism; 
Abolition of the sardari-jirga system; 
Free, compulsory education for the Baloch, and equality for Baloch women;
Promotion of Baloch culture.

Simultaneously with the formation of the Anjuman, Baloch intellectuals in Karachi formed a nationalist organisation, called the Baloch League.

In February 1937, the Anjuman reorganised and became the Kalat State National Party, carrying on the Anjuman's political agenda of an independent united state of Balochistan. They demanded the independence of the ancient Khanate of Kalat, which was later incorporated into Pakistan in 1955. The party was dominated by more secular-minded, anti-imperialist and populist elements, such as Ghaus Bakhsh Bizenjo, Mir Gul Khan Naseer and Abdul Aziz Kurd. When parliamentary elections were held in the State of Kalat, the party was the largest winner with a considerable majority.

In 2017, the World Baloch Organisation placed advertisements on taxis in London to say #FreeBalochistan along with slogans such as "Stop enforced disappearances" and "Save the Baloch people". These were initially allowed but later denied permission by Transport for London.  The World Baloch Organisation claimed that this was a result of pressure from the Pakistani Government after the British High Commissioner in Islamabad was summoned to appear before the Pakistani Foreign Secretary.

See also
Balochistan Liberation Army
Insurgency in Balochistan
Sindhudesh
Sindhudesh Liberation Army
Separatist movements of Pakistan
Saraikistan

References

Sources
In Afghanistan's Shadow: Baluch Nationalism and Soviet Temptations, Selig Harrison, Carnegie Endowment for International Peace, New York, 1981
Baluch Nationalism and Superpower Rivalry, Selig Harrison, International Security, Vol. 5 No. 3 (Winter 1980-1981) pp 152–163
Knights, Not Pawns: Ethno-Nationalism and Regional Dynamics in Post-Colonial Balochistan, Paul Titus and Nina Swidler, International Journal of Middle East Studies, Vol. 32, No. 1 (Feb., 2000), pp. 47–69

External links
The Resurgence of Baluch Nationalism, Frederic Grare, Carnegie Endowment for International Peace, Paper No. 65, January 2006
Balochistan's history of insurgency
Pakistan: The Worsening Conflict in Balochistan, International Crisis Group, Asia Report N°119, 14 September 2006

 
Baloch society
Balochistan
History of Balochistan
Nationalist movements in Asia